San Nicolò dei Mendicoli ("Saint Nicholas of the Beggars") is a church, which is located in the sestiere of Dorsoduro in Venice.

History
The islet where the original church was located previously housed poor fishermen, hence the addition of mendicoli ("beggars") to the name of San Nicolò. From then on, the inhabitants were called Nicolotti. The present structure dates from about the 12th century, with frequent reconstructions. The present bell tower was added in 1764 to replace an older one.

The entrance lies on the right of the nave. The nave is bordered by peculiar Corinthian-like columns. The hooked bills of the capitals derive from the coats of arms of patron families. In the chancel is a 15th-century statue of Saint Nicholas holding three golden spheres, symbolizing the money donated, in his legend, to save three girls from prostitution. The canvases on the nave walls were made by various painters, including Alvise Benfatto. Two end panels on the ceiling are by Leonardo Corona and those in the middle by Francesco Montemezzano.

The church and its interiors were used extensively in the 1973 Nick Roeg film Don't Look Now.

References

Roman Catholic churches in Venice
12th-century Roman Catholic church buildings in Italy